Bassiknysna is a genus of moths of the family Crambidae. It contains only one species, Bassiknysna jansei, which is found in South Africa.

References

Endemic moths of South Africa
Crambinae
Crambidae genera
Monotypic moth genera